Ricardo Lynch (born September 20, 1984) is a Jamaican professional track cyclist. He most prominent result was finishing second to Chris Hoy in the keirin event at the track cycling World Cup round in Copenhagen in 2008.

Palmarès 

 2008
 2007–2008 World Cup
 2nd, Keirin, Copenhagen

External links 
 

Jamaican male cyclists
Jamaican track cyclists
1984 births
Living people
Cyclists at the 2006 Commonwealth Games
Commonwealth Games competitors for Jamaica
Cyclists at the 2008 Summer Olympics
Olympic cyclists of Jamaica
Central American and Caribbean Games silver medalists for Jamaica
Competitors at the 2006 Central American and Caribbean Games
Central American and Caribbean Games medalists in cycling
20th-century Jamaican people
21st-century Jamaican people